Badejo is a surname. Notable people with the surname include:
 Babafemi Badejo (born 1955), Nigerian diplomat and academic
 Bolaji Badejo (1953–1992), Nigerian visual artist and actor
 Emmanuel Adetoyese Badejo (born 1961), Nigerian Roman Catholic prelate

See also
 Pedra Badejo, a city in Cape Verde
 Lagoas de Pedra Badejo, wetlands near the Cape Verdean city
 Badejo Field, an offshore oil field of Brazil